The Australian Club in Melbourne, Australia is a gentleman's club founded in 1878 by English settlers to provide accommodation, food and refreshments, and congenial surroundings for Melbourne and Victorian businessmen.

The Club is still active and its building at 110 William Street retains its original 19th-century architecture and furniture.

Notable members
The following notable persons are known to have been members:
Sir William John Clarke (1831–1897), landowner, stud-breeder and philanthropist
Sir Ernest Thomas Fisk (1886–1965), radio pioneer and businessman
Sir Colin Fraser (1875–1944),
Duncan Gillies (1834–1903), politician
Rupert W. Hornabrook (1871–1951), anaesthetist
Sir Harry Sutherland Wightman Lawson (1875–1952), politician and lawyer
Sir James MacBain (1828–1892), businessman and politician
John Alexander MacPherson (1833–1894), politician
Sir Norman Angus Martin (1893–1978), farmer, grazier and politician
Alexander Morrison (1829–1903), schoolmaster
Sir William Herbert Phillipps (1847–1935), merchant and philanthropist in SA
Sir Alfred Roberts (1823–1898), surgeon
William Rutledge (1806–1876), merchant, banker and settler
Edmund Edmonds Smith (1847–1914), ship-owner
Sir Sydney Snow (1887–1958), retailer
Sir Colin Syme (1903–1986), businessman
Col. P. W. Vaughan (1871–1945), banker
William Irving Winter-Irving (1840–1901), pastoralist
Charles William Wren (1856–1934), banker

References

External links
Australian Club — about us
Victorian Heritage Database

1878 establishments in Australia

Organizations established in 1878
Organisations based in Melbourne
Gentlemen's clubs in Australia
Clubs and societies in Victoria (Australia)
Buildings and structures in Melbourne City Centre